Nudity is sometimes used as a tactic during a protest to attract media and public attention to a cause, and sometimes promotion of public nudity is itself the objective of a nude protest. The use of the tactic goes back to well published photos of nude protests by svobodniki in Canada in 1903. The tactic has been used by other groups later in the century, especially after the 1960s. Like public nudity in general, the cultural and legal acceptance of nudity as a tactic in protest also varies around the world. Some opponents of any public nudity claim that it is indecent, especially when it can be viewed by children; while others argue that it is a legitimate form of expression covered by the right to free speech.

Even in places where public nudity is tolerated, it is still unexpected enough that its use by activists as a deliberate tactic is often successful in attracting publicity from the media. For example, on July 19, 2020, a young woman wearing only a face mask and stocking cap, later dubbed "Naked Athena" by reporters, confronted police in Portland, Oregon, during George Floyd protests. Despite the deployment of pepper balls and tear gas, she posed for police for several minutes before they withdrew. Photographs of her action went viral.

Some nude activism is not to promote a particular cause, but rather to promote public nudity itself, or to change community perceptions of the naked human body, or as an expression of a personal desire to be nude in public.

Single issue protests

Anti-fur campaign
People for the Ethical Treatment of Animals (PETA) has used nudity to draw attention to its anti-fur campaign. Between 1992 and 2020, PETA ran their "I'd rather go naked than wear fur" campaign featuring celebrities, actors and models. In 2020, PETA discontinued the campaign after a majority of fashion houses and high street stores stopped using fur.

Brexit
On 29 June 2016, Cambridge academic, Victoria Bateman walked into a meeting of the Faculty of Economics while naked in protest against the results of the 2016 United Kingdom European Union membership referendum. She had written on her breasts and stomach "Brexit leaves Britain naked".

Land rights
Women in the Amuru district of Uganda protested about their loss of land for farming.

Peace and anti-war
Groups used nudity to protest the Iraq War. Groups using their bodies to form words and symbols to convey their message included Baring Witness.

The African curse of nakedness

In some parts of Africa, women have used stripping naked on purpose as a curse, both historically, and in modern times. The idea is that women give life and they can take it away. The curse initiates an extreme form of ostracism, which anthropologist Terisa Turner has likened to "social execution".  The curse extends to foreign men as well, and is believed to cause impotence, madness or other similar harm. The threat has been used successfully in mass protests against the petroleum industry in Nigeria, by Leymah Gbowee and Women of Liberia Mass Action for Peace during the Second Liberian Civil War, and against President Laurent Gbagbo of the Ivory Coast. In 2002 in Nigeria, members of the Niger Delta Women for Justice occupied a platform for oil extraction run by ChevronTexaco in order to protest against negative consequences of oil extraction and missing labor rights. When the military arrived to remove the protestors, the women threatened the soldiers to naked curse them. The soldiers did not touch the women.

A group of about 16 women bared their buttocks and stormed into the offices of the African National Congress (ANC) in Tshwane. The women were protesting against the outcome of an ANC Tshwane branch general meeting. The women claimed bouncers, armed with pangas and firearms, stormed the meeting and stopped them from participating in the voting process to elect the new branch committee.

Equal facilities for female athletes
To demand fuller implementation of the United States legislation Title IX, the 1976 Yale University women's rowing team held a naked protest. Pointing attention to their inadequate training facilities were more than a dozen team members, including Christine Ernst, Anne Warner and Ginny Gilder.

Transgender rights
In November 2011, a transgender woman from Morristown, Tennessee was arrested and jailed for 21 days for indecent exposure after removing her top in the parking lot of her local department of motor vehicles after they refused to alter the gender designation on her driver's license from male to female. This was despite the fact that the U.S. federal government Social Security office already had done so. As it is legal for a man to go topless in public and since the Tennessee Department of Public Safety refused to recognise her as female, Ms. Jones decided to protest her treatment by going topless, stating "if I was a male, I had the right to, when I stepped out the door, take off my shirt... It's not right for the state to ask me to be both male and female. A choice needs to be made. They cannot hold me to both standards."

Femicide is Genocide
In June 2017 more than 100 women stripped naked in front of the president's palace, Casa Rosada, in Buenos Aires, Argentina to protest against violence against women.

Women's rights in Islamic countries 

Following the Arab Spring in the early 2010s, women in Islamic counties made personal protests opposing the restrictions on their freedom by posting nude photographs of themselves on the internet. Aliaa Magda Elmahdy an Egyptian and Amina Tyler from Tunisia fled to Europe to escape legal and religious threats.

Human gene editing
On 8 February 2017 artist Rick Gibson walked naked in front of the Vancouver Law Courts in the middle of winter to protest Canada's ban of genetic engineering of the human genome.

Public nudity movements

Not all people who engage in public nudity see themselves as  nudists or naturists or belong to traditional naturist or nudist organizations. Several activists, such as Vincent Bethell, claim that associations with naturism or nudism are unnecessary. Others will point out that many people who participate in events such as clothing-optional bike rides or visit clothing-optional beaches do so casually and without association or formal affiliation to groups or movements. Activist Daniel Johnson believes that labels and affiliations overly complicate a relatively simple phenomenon, alienate others from a fear of over-commitment or undesirable stereotypes, and thus get in the way of integrating nudity into everyday life.

Clothing-optional bike rides

World Naked Bike Ride (WNBR) is an international clothing-optional bike ride in which participants plan, meet and ride together en masse on human-powered transport (the vast majority on bicycles, and fewer on skateboards, rollerblades, roller skates) to "protest oil dependency and celebrate the power and individuality of our bodies". This represents one of the few events that combine elements that could be described as pro nudity and pro cycling (as well as environmental).

Many of the political rides have their roots from Critical Mass and are often described or categorized as a form of political protest, street theatre, party-on-wheels, streaking, public nudity and clothing-optional recreation and thus attracts a wide range of participants. Since 1996 Critical Tits has been hosting a "raucous topless bicycle joyride" on Friday afternoon at the annual Burning Man festival in Nevada.

The Spanish movement, Manifestación Ciclonudista Mundial has had rides predating WNBR (since 2001) and has since spread to other countries in Europe.

FEMEN

The protest group FEMEN (founded in 2008 in Ukraine) regularly stages topless protests against sex tourists, international marriage agencies, sexism and other social ills. These protests received worldwide press coverage in 2009. Since late 2011 FEMEN operations became not limited to Ukraine and they have demonstrated in other European countries including non-Ukrainian protesters. FEMEN justifies its provocative methods stating "If we staged simple protests with banners, then our claims would not have been noticed". FEMEN receives small financial backing by individuals. In January 2012, three members of the group staged a topless protest at the World Economic Forum in Davos, Switzerland. In October 2013 FEMEN had its largest membership in France (30 FEMEN France local activists in January 2013). In October 2012 the organization claimed it had about 40 activists in Ukraine, and another 100 who had joined their protests abroad.

Naturist and nudist movements
There are a number of groups and individuals campaigning for the right to be naked in public.

Urbanudista
A group led by Avril X called UrbaNudismo has led several casual nudity excursions in high visibility public urban environments in Brazil as well as some Western European countries.

APNEL
APNEL is the prominent French nudity rights group.

NAKTIV
Naktiv.net is a generic Naked Activities site.

Denmark
In 1969, in Denmark, 300 individuals participated in a naked "wade-in" at a Danish beach, which helped push forward a reform of public policy. It is now allowable to be naked at any public beach in Denmark with only two major exceptions: Holmsland Klit and Hennestrand. The remaining 4,700 kilometers of Danish coast are clothing-optional.

United States
 Naturist Action Committee – NAC is a non-profit donor-supported organization that promotes and defends naturist interests in the courts, before legislative bodies, at universities, and to local business communities
 Friends of Disco Beach, Magnuson Beach Bares, Seattle Free Beach Campaign and Body Freedom Collaborative in Seattle
 Free Beach USA
 Barbara LaFleur walked nude into two stores in Saratoga Springs, NY in 2012 as a protest for naturist rights. "She is just a person who believes in the freedom of nudism. That was her explanation", said Saratoga County District Attorney James Murphy III.

Australia
The short-lived Naturist Lifestyle Party in New South Wales, Australia, aimed "to bring naturism into the public eye, and to get an equitable allocation of public resources to those who support the naturist lifestyle." Gerald Ganglbauer convened Free Beach Action NSW, a lobby group for naturism in New South Wales.

Netherlands
Robbert Broekstra (now deceased) was involved in a group called "Friends of Nature".  They would often go for naked excursions on public lands, sometimes in urban areas, often taking pictures. He was also involved in INIC (International Naturist Information Center). He authored the book Robbert Broekstra's Nude World and his group appeared in "Naked Travels 1", by Charles MacFarland.

Germany
 Wald-FKK – German movement for the liberalisation of public nudity. Founder Peter Niehenke was fined several times for indecent exposure because he went running nude in public spaces.
 Nacktwandern – German movement for the freedom to hike in the nude.
 Integral Nactiv –  Nacktiv is a combination of the German word "nackt" (naked) and "aktiv" (active).

The Freedom to be Yourself
The Freedom to be Yourself campaign (TFTBY or FTBY) was founded in 1998 by Vincent Bethell. The group, according to Bethell is about "the right to be naked in public". Supporters of TFTBY organized several grassroots naked protests in public in London; protests also took place in Brighton, Bristol, Birmingham, Coventry, and some in the United States.

Terri Sue Webb is an activist living in Bend, Oregon, who was one of few activists in the United States active in the TFTBY campaign. She has been imprisoned and released multiple times for public nudity. On several occasions she has remained nude while incarcerated, often resulting in a much longer jail sentence. There has been quite a bit of media coverage of her activities. Daniel Johnson went nude with her in public on two occasions in 2001 and 2002.

Vincent Bethell made legal history in January 2001 by being the first defendant to stand trial naked in a UK court. The trial was at Southwark Crown Court London. Vincent was naked throughout this court case, and was found not guilty. Stephen Gough, also known as "Steve Gough" and "the naked rambler", is an activist from Eastleigh, Hampshire, famous for walking the length of Great Britain from Land's End to John o' Groats in 2003–2004 and again in 2005–2006 (that year accompanied by his girlfriend Melanie Roberts), with nothing on except boots, socks, rucksack and sometimes a hat.  He has been arrested several times and put in prison in the course of his rambles. In his last walk he was only arrested twice in England, and released almost immediately, but due to the different legal system and laws in Scotland, he was arrested many more times after crossing the border and spent time in HMP Edinburgh, then moved to HMP Barlinnie Glasgow in June 2008.

Richard Collins has been cycling naked through his home town of Cambridge, England for some time. He has been organizing several protests on the TFTBY Stop Segregation discussion group (no longer in existence). Richard has been arrested numerous times and released, although he was convicted of an offence under section 5, Public Order Act 1986, in Bournemouth, England, on 13 June  after his nude cycling attracted complaints approximately 12 months earlier. Richard says: "My outings are NOT protests as such but 'activities'. Simply me having fun! And exercising my right to nude freedom!"

Topfreedom

The topfreedom movement has challenged the law in a number of countries, especially in North America and in Europe, on sex equality grounds arguing that the present public indecency laws discriminate against women. The movement advocates equal rights for women to be topfree in the same circumstances that a man is permitted to be bare-chested.

The Topfree Equal Rights Association (TERA) is a Canadian organization which endeavors to assist women who are having legal troubles exercising their rights to be topfree. Their website states that they serve both Canada and the United States. The organization also aims to inform and educate the public about topfreedom, and to change laws against topfreedom in North American jurisdictions. GoTopless goes further and organizes demonstrations to protest against the legal and public attitude to the inequality. In Sweden, Bara Bröst is active in advancing topfreedom, as is Topless Front in Denmark. In France, the feminist collective Les TumulTueuses has the slogan: "My body if I want, when I want, like it is" ("Mon corps si je veux, quand je veux, tel qu'il est").

See also
 Civil disobedience
 Lady Godiva
 List of social nudity organizations
 Social nudism
 Timeline of non-sexual social nudity
 Zevs Cosmos

References

Books
Carr-Gomm, Philip (2010). A brief history of nakedness. London: Reaktion. .
Lunceford, Brett (2012). Naked politics : nudity, political action, and the rhetoric of the body. Lanham, Md.: Lexington Books. .

Articles
Nude & Natural Takin' It to the Streets: The Cutting Edge of Naturism by Mark Storey,  23.4: 73, Summer 2004. Mark claims "The future of naturism is on public lands. To gain naturist freedoms on public lands will require getting naked in public".
Nude & Natural The Offense of Public Nudity by Mark Storey
Nude & Natural Naturism and Civil Disobedience by Mark Storey
Nude & Natural The Bethell Approach: A Protest Colloquy/The Bethell Approach: Is the Time for Mass Nude Protests Upon Us? 21.2 Winter 2002. Includes statements by Vincent Bethell, Mark Nisbet, Cec Cinder, Paul Rapoport, Les Rootsey, Morley Schloss, T.A. Wyner, and Mark Storey.
Nude & Natural (N), Guerilla Nudity/Wave Makers: Introducing the Body Freedom Collaborative by Mark Storey. Issue 23.1, Autumn 2003.
Nude & Natural (N), Terri Sue Webb: An American Bethell/Beyond Safe Havens: Oregon's Terri Sue Webb  by Daniel Lorenz Johnson. San Francisco's Nude Skate Dude: How a naked roller put body freedom on wheels. Issue 21.3: pp. 24–28, Spring 2002.

Press coverage
Seattle Post-Intelligencer, Exposed and stark naked – on purpose: But not all nudists support 'guerrilla' plans for prominent public exposure, by P-I reporter Kathy George, April 7, 2003. 
Seattle Post-Intelligencer, Trio behind the arts: Three activists put on an eye-opening display yesterday by taking most of their clothes off at the Fremont Fresh Art Festival, by P-I reporter Kathy George, 16 June 2003 Front page of local section, with color picture

Filmography
Being Human A film by Lisa Seidenberg, 31 minutes, 2003 Metro Video
Taboo – 40 Years of Censorship. Part 1 of 4: Shock of the Nude; BBC2 Television series ran at 9:50 pm (40 mins). Aired Wednesday, 21 November 2001.

Videos and pictures
30 minute documentary by Johnny Zapatos (High Altitude Films) of the first World Naked Bike Ride to take place on the streets of London (4 parts)
Pictures of the World Naked Bike Ride on Flickr
You Never Bike Alone – Feature documentary includes section on WNBR history

External links

Skin-Freedom activism – Stop Racist Human Skin Phobia.
Naked Protest blog
World Naked Bike Ride official site – general information and other resources
World Naked Bike Ride wiki site  – lists upcoming and past events, provides information for joining existing and creating new rides
BBC article about Steve Gough following his first successful walk.
BBC article about Steve Gough following his second successful walk.
University of Edinburgh, School of Law, Scots Law News has many references to Gough.

Videos
UrbaNudista YouTube Video

 
1903 establishments in Canada